Musherib (Q61) is the lead ship of the  offshore patrol vessels built for the Qatari Emiri Navy.

Development 
Fincantieri showcased the Musherib-class offshore patrol vessels for the Qatari Emiri Navy during DIMDEX 2018. In August 2017, Qatar officially announced for the order of the two ships of the class after signing the contract in June 2016. 

They are able to operate high speed boats such as rigid-hulled inflatable boats with the help of lateral cranes and hauling ramps.

Construction and career 
Musherib was laid down in August 2017 in Fincantieri shipyard in Muggiano, Italy. She was launched on 18 September 2020, and expected to arrive in Qatar in 2022.

References

External links
 Military Factory

2020 ships
Ships of the Qatari Emiri Navy
Musherib-class offshore patrol vessels